The 2011 Tums Fast Relief 500 was a NASCAR Sprint Cup Series stock car race held on October 30, 2011, at Martinsville Speedway in Ridgeway, Virginia, United States. Contested over 500 laps on the 0.526-mile (847 m) oval, it was the 33rd race of the 2011 Sprint Cup Series season, as well as the seventh race in the ten-race Chase for the Sprint Cup, which ends the season. The race was won by Tony Stewart for the Stewart Haas Racing team. Jimmie Johnson finished second, and Jeff Gordon clinched third.

Report

Background

Martinsville Speedway is one of five short tracks to hold NASCAR races; the others are Richmond International Raceway, Dover International Speedway, Bristol Motor Speedway, and Phoenix International Raceway. The track's turns are banked at eleven degrees, while the front stretch, the location of the finish line, is banked at zero degrees. The back stretch also has s zero degree banking. The racetrack has seats for 63,000 spectators.

Before the race, Carl Edwards led the Drivers' Championship with 2,237 points, and Matt Kenseth stood in second with 2,223 points. Brad Keselowski followed in third with 2,219 points, one ahead of Tony Stewart and eight ahead of Kevin Harvick in fourth and fifth. Kyle Busch with 2,197 was ten points ahead of Jimmie Johnson, as Kurt Busch with 2,185 points, was 22 ahead of Dale Earnhardt Jr., and 30 in front of Jeff Gordon. Denny Hamlin and Ryan Newman was eleventh and twelfth with 2,153 and 2,149 points. In the Manufacturers' Championship, Chevrolet was leading with 217 points, 44 points ahead of Ford. Toyota, with 164 points, was 14 points ahead of Dodge in the battle for third. Hamlin was the race's defending champion.

Practice and qualifying
Two 90 minute practice sessions were scheduled to be held on Friday in preparation for the race. However, wet track conditions postponed and combined the sessions into one practice session on Saturday. Afterward, the only session was delayed because of the wet track conditions. Once the first and only session of practice began, Michael McDowell was quickest with a time of 19.747 seconds in the first session, 0.023 seconds faster than Clint Bowyer. Johnson was just off Bowyer's pace, followed by Carl Jamie McMurray, Scott Speed, and Paul Menard. David Stremme was seventh, still within a tenth of a second of McDowell's time. Also in the session, there was a collision involving Harvick and Greg Biffle. Neither car was severely damaged from the incident.

Forty-five cars were entered for qualifying, but only forty-three could qualify for the race because of NASCAR's qualifying procedure. Wet track conditions before the scheduled starting time canceled the session, causing the grid to be created by Owners' Championship points. Edwards was given the pole position. He was joined on the front row of the grid by Kenseth. Keselowski started third, Stewart took fourth, and Harvick fifth. Kyle Busch, Johnson, Kurt Busch, Earnhardt Jr. and Gordon completed the top ten. The two drivers that failed to qualify for the race were Dennis Setzer and Derrike Cope. Afterward, Edwards commented:

Race

The race, the 33rd in the season, began at 2:00 p.m. EDT and was televised live in the United States on ESPN. Tony Beach, associate Pastor at Ft. Trial Baptist Church in Stanleytown, Virginia, began pre-race ceremonies by giving the invocation. Next, North Carolina Agricultural and Technical State University Blue and Gold Marching Machine performed the national anthem, and Ashley Young, winner of the Tums Sweepstakes, gave the command for drivers to start their engines. A late race caution set up a restart with 3 laps remaining, with Jimmie Johnson and Tony Stewart on the front row. Johnson chose the heavily-favored inside line, but Stewart had a great restart and cleared Johnson off of Turn 4 coming to 2 to go. Brad Keselowski was spun out on the restart, but was able to get back going and NASCAR decided not to throw the caution. Stewart would go on to win the race, his 3rd race victory of the 2011 season, all of them coming during the Chase.

Results

Qualifying

Race results

Standings after the race

Drivers' Championship standings

Manufacturers' Championship standings

Note: Only the top twelve positions are included for the driver standings.

References

Tums Fast Relief 500
Tums Fast Relief 500
NASCAR races at Martinsville Speedway
October 2011 sports events in the United States